The Museum of Photography in the Charlottenburg district of Berlin, Germany, is one of the Berlin State Museums administered by the Prussian Cultural Heritage Foundation. 

It is located next to the Zoologischer Garten railway station in the building of a former Landwehr officers' mess, erected in 1909 according to plans by Heino Schmieden. The museum opened in 2004 and also houses the collection of the Helmut Newton Foundation. In addition to the rotating special exhibits, the permanent exhibit "Helmut Newton's Private Property" displays some of the late photographers' personal articles.

References

External links
Official website
Helmut Newton Foundation

Photography museums and galleries in Germany
Museums in Berlin
Museum of Photography
Art museums established in 2004
Museum of Photography
Berlin State Museums